In mathematics, specifically in topology and geometry, a pseudoholomorphic curve (or J-holomorphic curve) is a smooth map from a Riemann surface into an almost complex manifold that satisfies the Cauchy–Riemann equation. Introduced in 1985 by Mikhail Gromov, pseudoholomorphic curves have since revolutionized the study of symplectic manifolds. In particular, they lead to the Gromov–Witten invariants and Floer homology, and play a prominent role in string theory.

Definition
Let  be an almost complex manifold with almost complex structure . Let  be a smooth Riemann surface (also called a complex curve) with complex structure .

Since , this condition is equivalent to

which simply means that the differential  is complex-linear, that is,  maps each tangent space

to itself. For technical reasons, it is often preferable to introduce some sort of inhomogeneous term  and to study maps satisfying the perturbed Cauchy–Riemann equation

A pseudoholomorphic curve satisfying this equation can be called, more specifically, a -holomorphic curve. The perturbation  is sometimes assumed to be generated by a Hamiltonian (particularly in Floer theory), but in general it need not be.

A pseudoholomorphic curve is, by its definition, always parametrized. As soon as the punctured Euler characteristic  is negative, there are only finitely many holomorphic reparametrizations of  that preserve the marked points. The domain curve  is an element of the Deligne–Mumford moduli space of curves.

Analogy with the classical Cauchy–Riemann equations
In real coordinates

and

where . After multiplying these matrices in two different orders, one sees immediately that the equation

written above is equivalent to the classical Cauchy–Riemann equations

Applications in symplectic topology
Although they can be defined for any almost complex manifold, pseudoholomorphic curves are especially interesting when  interacts with a symplectic form . An almost complex structure  is said to be -tame if and only if

for all nonzero tangent vectors . Tameness implies that the formula

Gromov showed that, for a given , the space of -tame  is nonempty and contractible. He used this theory to prove a non-squeezing theorem concerning symplectic embeddings of spheres into cylinders.

Gromov showed that certain moduli spaces of pseudoholomorphic curves (satisfying additional specified conditions) are compact, and described the way in which pseudoholomorphic curves can degenerate when only finite energy is assumed.  (The finite energy condition holds most notably for curves with a fixed homology class in a symplectic manifold where J is -tame or -compatible).  This Gromov compactness theorem, now greatly generalized using stable maps, makes possible the definition of Gromov–Witten invariants, which count pseudoholomorphic curves in symplectic manifolds.

Compact moduli spaces of pseudoholomorphic curves are also used to construct Floer homology, which Andreas Floer (and later authors, in greater generality) used to prove the famous conjecture of Vladimir Arnol'd concerning the number of fixed points of Hamiltonian flows.

Applications in physics
In type II string theory, one considers surfaces traced out by strings as they travel along paths in a Calabi–Yau 3-fold. Following the path integral formulation of quantum mechanics, one wishes to compute certain integrals over the space of all such surfaces. Because such a space is infinite-dimensional, these path integrals are not mathematically well-defined in general. However, under the A-twist one can deduce that the surfaces are parametrized by pseudoholomorphic curves, and so the path integrals reduce to integrals over moduli spaces of pseudoholomorphic curves (or rather stable maps), which are finite-dimensional. In closed type IIA string theory, for example, these integrals are precisely the Gromov–Witten invariants.

See also

 Holomorphic curve

References
 Dusa McDuff and Dietmar Salamon, J-Holomorphic Curves and Symplectic Topology, American Mathematical Society colloquium publications, 2004. .
 Mikhail Leonidovich Gromov, Pseudo holomorphic curves in symplectic manifolds.  Inventiones Mathematicae vol. 82, 1985, pgs. 307-347.
 

Complex manifolds
Symplectic topology
Algebraic geometry
String theory
Curves